This is a list of colonial and departmental heads of Mayotte. Mayotte is a French overseas department and region and single territorial collectivity with a population of about 300,000 located in the Mozambique Channel of the Indian Ocean, between Madagascar and Mozambique, off the coast of Southeast Africa. The chief of state is the French President, who is represented by a Prefect. The president of the General Council acts as head of the government. Elections held in Mayotte include the French presidential vote. A prefect is appointed by the president on the advice of the French Ministry of the Interior. The presidents of the General and Regional Councils are elected by members of those councils.

List of officeholders

(Dates in italics indicate de facto continuation of office)

See also
 Politics of Mayotte
 History of Mayotte

References

External links
 World Statesmen – Mayotte
 Mayotte Actualite: List of Prefects of Mayotte (French)

Government of Mayotte
Mayotte
Colonial and Departmental Heads
Colonial and Departmental Heads